Yoshinori Sato (佐藤 義則, born September 11, 1954 in Okushiri District, Hokkaido, Japan) is a former Nippon Professional Baseball pitcher.

External links

1954 births
Living people
Baseball people from Hokkaido
Japanese baseball players
Nippon Professional Baseball pitchers
Hankyu Braves players
Orix Braves players
Orix BlueWave players
Nippon Professional Baseball Rookie of the Year Award winners
Japanese baseball coaches
Nippon Professional Baseball coaches